The Songs Lennon and McCartney Gave Away is a conceptual compilation album containing the original artist recordings of songs composed by John Lennon and Paul McCartney in the 1960s that they had elected not to release as Beatles songs. The album was released in the UK in 1979.

With the exception of "I'm the Greatest", a Ringo Starr album track written for him by John Lennon in 1973, all songs were recorded and released as singles during the active Beatles years in the 1960s.

There are three songs written by Paul McCartney when the Beatles were together that are not in this compilation: “Thingumybob", recorded by Black Dyke Mills Band, "Goodbye", recorded by Mary Hopkin, and "Come and Get It", recorded by Badfinger.

A similar but less comprehensive compilation, The Stars Sing Lennon & McCartney, had been released on EMI's mid-price Music for Pleasure label in 1971.

Background
Lennon and McCartney started writing songs together in the late 1950s and by 1963 were prolific composers who wrote songs for the Beatles and also for other artists. There were broadly three categories of Lennon–McCartney songs that were not released by the Beatles:

Recordings by the Beatles of Lennon–McCartney songs that the group ultimately decided not to release.
Lennon–McCartney songs that the Beatles deemed unsuitable for the group at the outset and did not even attempt to record themselves.
Songs that had been intentionally written for other artists.

In the earliest days of their songwriting partnership, Lennon and McCartney expressed a desire to emulate the success of composing duos such as Goffin & King and Leiber & Stoller in having their compositions recorded by other artists, so this was an aspect of the songwriting craft that they were interested in pursuing.

With the encouragement of the Beatles' manager Brian Epstein, they supplied some of their songs deemed unsuitable for the Beatles to fellow artists, several of whom were also managed by Epstein and were friends of the Beatles. Once the Beatles' initial success in early-mid 1963 mushroomed into a phenomenon, there was great interest in songs written by the Beatles "in-house" writing duo. Artists began clamouring to secure original Lennon–McCartney songs knowing that there would automatically be media and public interest in such songs.

The quality of the songs and the subsequent commercial success of such songs added to the demand by artists for even more compositions.

Track listing 

Notes:

Artwork
McCartney's profile in the artwork for the front cover reused a portion of the illustration from the Beatles' album Revolver, and Lennon's profile is a drawing that duplicated the back-cover photograph from his album Imagine.

See also
Lennon–McCartney non-Beatles songs

References

1979 compilation albums
Pop compilation albums
Rock compilation albums
EMI Records compilation albums